Gu Kailai (born 15 November 1958) is a Chinese former lawyer and businesswoman. She is the second wife of former Politburo member Bo Xilai, one of China's most influential politicians until he was stripped of his offices in 2012. In August 2012, Gu was convicted of murdering British businessman Neil Heywood and was given a suspended death sentence, later commuted to life imprisonment in December 2015.

Family, early life and education 
Gu is the youngest of five daughters of General Gu Jingsheng, a prominent revolutionary in the years before the Chinese Communist Party took power. General Gu held various government positions during early Communist rule but was imprisoned during the Cultural Revolution. Gu Kailai herself was also punished, being forced to work in a butcher shop and a textile factory.

Gu met Bo Xilai in 1984 while on a field trip looking into environmental art in Jin County, Liaoning, where he was the Communist Party secretary. The couple have one son, Bo Kuangyi, known as Guagua.

Gu Kailai gained a degree in law and then a masters in international politics from Peking University.

Career 
Gu went on to become an accomplished lawyer founding the Kailai law firm in Beijing. In the course of her career, she was involved in several high-profile cases, and is suggested to have been the first Chinese lawyer to win a civil suit in the United States, where she represented several Dalian-area companies involved in a dispute in Mobile, Alabama. In 1998, she published a book named Uphold Justice in America (《胜诉在美国》), about how she won the lawsuit in the US.

Views on justice systems
After visiting the United States, Kailai ridiculed the U.S. justice system as inept, writing "They can level charges against dogs and a court can even convict a husband of raping his wife," she wrote. Gu wrote that, "We don't play with words and we adhere to the principle of 'based on facts,'...You will be arrested, sentenced and executed as long as we determine that you killed someone."

Murder investigation

In March 2012, Gu became embroiled in a national scandal after her husband's deputy, Wang Lijun, sought refuge at the U.S. consulate in Chengdu. It was rumored that Wang presented evidence of a corruption scandal, whereby Bo sought to impede a corruption investigation against Gu. Specifically, Wang stated that Gu had been involved in a business dispute with British businessman Neil Heywood, who died in Chongqing under disputed circumstances; Wang alleged he had been poisoned. The Wall Street Journal reported that Wang may have fallen out of favor with Bo for discussing the Heywood case.
 
Following the Wang Lijun incident and Bo's removal from key Communist Party posts, Gu was placed under investigation for Heywood's death. On 10 April 2012, Gu was detained and "transferred to the judicial authorities" as part of the investigation. In an unusual move, state media appended her husband's surname in front of her own (rendering her name as Bo Gu Kailai), extremely unusual for married women in People's Republic of China, without any explanation. Some speculate that it may imply that Gu may have acquired citizenship of a foreign country, and as a result "Bo Gu Kailai" appeared on her official documents; Others suggest that this is because authorities wanted to emphasize that Gu's alleged crimes were linked to misconduct by her husband.

Trial and verdict
On 26 July 2012, Gu was formally charged with murdering Heywood, based on what the prosecutor claimed was "irrefutable and substantial" evidence. On 9 August 2012, according to the official Xinhua News Agency, Gu admitted during a one-day trial that she was responsible for Heywood's murder. She claimed that her actions were due to a "mental breakdown", and stated that she would "accept and calmly face any sentence".

On 20 August 2012, Gu received a suspended death sentence, which is normally commuted to a life sentence after two years, but she could be released on medical parole after serving nine years in prison. The trial lasted one day, and Gu did not contest her charges. Zhang Xiaojun, a Bo family aide, was sentenced to 9 years in jail for his involvement in the murder following his confession.

After the media published footage of the trial, claims that the woman shown in court was not in fact Gu, but a body double, quickly became popular on Chinese Internet fora, and Chinese authorities attempted to censor them. Experts held differing opinions on the matter: the Financial Times cited the conclusion of "security experts familiar with facial recognition software" that the person who stood trial was not Gu, whereas a facial recognition expert contacted by Slate was of the opinion that the woman most likely was Gu. The practice of rich people paying others to stand trial and receive punishment in their place, called ding zui, is relatively widespread in China.

Following the verdict, the United Kingdom announced that it welcomed the investigation, and said that they "consistently made clear to the Chinese authorities that we wanted to see the trials in this case conform to international human rights standards and for the death penalty not to be applied." BBC News commented that "informed observers see the fingerprints of the Communist Party of China all over this outcome", stating that the trial's conclusion was "all too neat and uncannily suited to one particular agenda", that of limiting the scandal's damage. The New York Times suggested the verdict "raised questions about official corruption and political favoritism within the Communist Party."

Officially, Neil Heywood was murdered because he demanded $22 million from Gu after a real estate venture failed, and after Heywood sent an email which threatened her son, Gu decided to neutralise the threat. At a hotel in Chongqing, Gu gave Heywood whiskey and tea. Heywood became drunk and vomited. When he tried to go to bed, Gu poured animal poison into his mouth and she placed pills next to him to make it appear as though he had overdosed on drugs.

However, according to Reuters, at the end of 2011, Gu asked Heywood to move a large amount of money out of China. Heywood agreed to do that if Gu paid him a certain amount of money. But Heywood asked for a larger cut of the money than Gu expected. When Gu told Heywood he was being greedy, Heywood threatened to expose what Gu was doing. Gu was outraged and decided to kill Heywood. An academic close to the Bo family said Wang Lijun had written two letters to the Central Commission for Discipline Inspection which accused Gu of moving several hundred million dollars out of the country. The CDIC did not act immediately but the letters increased pressure for a deep probe.

On 14 December 2015, Gu Kailai's sentence was commuted to life imprisonment. The prison authorities said Gu had expressed repentance and had made no intentional offences during their review.

Popular culture 
In the 2019 film The Laundromat, Gu was portrayed by actress Rosalind Chao.

References

Living people
1958 births
Bo Xilai family
Chinese people convicted of murder
Chinese prisoners and detainees
20th-century Chinese businesswomen
20th-century Chinese businesspeople
21st-century Chinese businesswomen
21st-century Chinese businesspeople
20th-century Chinese lawyers
21st-century Chinese lawyers
Peking University alumni
People convicted of murder by the People's Republic of China
Prisoners and detainees of the People's Republic of China
Prisoners sentenced to death by the People's Republic of China
People from Yuncheng
Businesspeople from Shanxi